Kornasoren (Noemfoor) Airport is a civil airport in Noemfoor, Schouten Islands, Indonesia. .  Commercial service is provided by Susi Air to Manokwari and Biak from this Airport.

History
The airfield was one of three constructed by the Japanese during their occupation of the island in 1943/1944.  The US Army 158th Regimental Combat Team landed on the beach and encountered stiff resistance. The 503rd Parachute Infantry Regiment parachuted on Kamiri Airifled on 3 July 1944. The Japanese garrison was largely defeated after a suicidal counter-attack by the Japanese on 5 July. The island was finally secured after a month of hard fighting on 31 August 1944.

The three airfields on Nomefoor (Kamiri, Namber and Yebrurro) were used by the American forces after liberating the island. All three were first repaired and upgraded by the Seabees of the 95th U.S. Naval Construction Battalion.

Kamiri is located along the northwest shoreline of the island and was used by the Royal Australian Air Force (RAAF) until July 1945 when it was abandoned.  It has been disused since the end of the war.

Namber is located along the southwest shoreline and was improved and used by American forces, then also abandoned after the end of the war.

Yebrurro Airfield, also used by the Americans, remained in service until the end of the war. It is still in use today as Kornasoren Airport.

Allied units stationed on Noemfoor
 309th Bombardment Wing		(28 July-9 November 1944)
 417th Bombardment Group					(9 September-6 December 1944)
 58th Fighter Group		(30 August 1944 – 3 April 1944)
 348th Fighter Group		(26 August 1944 – 16 November 1944)
 RAAF 75 Squadron (P-40) 22 July 1944
 RAAF 76 Squadron (P-40) July 1944
 RAAF 80 Squadron (P-40) November 1944
 RAAF 22 Squadron (A-20) August 1944
 RAAF 30 Squadron (Beaufighter) September 1944
 RAAF 37 Squadron (Loadstar) August 1944

Airlines and destinations

See also

 USAAF in the Southwest Pacific

References

 Maurer, Maurer (1983). Air Force Combat Units of World War II. Maxwell AFB, Alabama: Office of Air Force History. .
 www.pacificwrecks.com

External links
Kornasoren Airport - Indonesia Airport global website

Biak Numfor Regency
Airports in Papua (province)
Airfields of the United States Army Air Forces in the South West Pacific theatre of World War II
World War II sites in Indonesia